is a professional race car driver.

Racing Record

Complete Formula Nippon results 
(key) (Races in bold indicate pole position) (Races in italics indicate fastest lap)

References 

1978 births
Living people
Japanese racing drivers
Formula Nippon drivers
24 Hours of Le Mans drivers

Nakajima Racing drivers
Team LeMans drivers